Volodymyr Kravets (born May 31, 1981 in Krasnoarmiisk, Donetsk Oblast) is a male boxer from Ukraine, who competed for his Eastern European country at the 2004 Summer Olympics in Athens, Greece. There he was stopped in the first round of the men's lightweight division (– 60 kg) by Pakistan's Asghar Ali Shah.

Kravets qualified for the Athens Games by ending up in second place at the 4th AIBA European 2004 Olympic Qualifying Tournament in Baku, Azerbaijan. In the final he lost to Russia's Murat Khrachev.

References
 sports-reference

1981 births
Living people
Lightweight boxers
Boxers at the 2004 Summer Olympics
Olympic boxers of Ukraine
People from Pokrovsk, Ukraine
Ukrainian male boxers
Sportspeople from Donetsk Oblast